Abraham Cohen Pimentel (died March 21, 1697) was a rabbi of Amsterdam.  He was a student of Saul Levi Morteira, and he also served as hakham of the synagogue in Hamburg and was initially a signator to a letter of approbation for Sabbatai Zevi.  He was the author of the Minchat Kohen, published in 1668.

References

17th-century Dutch rabbis
Year of birth unknown
1697 deaths
Exponents of Jewish law
Dutch Sephardi Jews